Sikandra Rao Assembly constituency is one of the 403 constituencies of the Uttar Pradesh Legislative Assembly, India. It is a part of the Hathras district and one of the five assembly constituencies in  the Hathras Lok Sabha constituency. First election in this assembly constituency was held in 1952 after the "DPACO (1951)" (delimitation order) was passed in 1951. After the "Delimitation of Parliamentary and Assembly Constituencies Order" was passed in 2008, the constituency was assigned identification number 80.

Wards/areas
Extent of Sikandra Rao Assembly constituency is Hathras Tehsil.

Members of the Legislative Assembly

Election results

2022

2017

2012

See also

Hathras district
Hathras Lok Sabha constituency
Sixteenth Legislative Assembly of Uttar Pradesh
Uttar Pradesh Legislative Assembly

References

External links
 

Assembly constituencies of Uttar Pradesh
Hathras district
Constituencies established in 1951